Sex Wars can refer to:

 The Feminist Sex Wars of the late 1970s through the 1980s
 Sex wars, a novel by Stanisław Lem
 Sex Wars (game show), an American game show that ran from 2000 to 2001
 Sex Wars, a novel by Marge Piercy
 Sex Wars (film), a film by Bob Vosse in 1985